Tracer may refer to:

Science
 Flow tracer, any fluid property used to track fluid motion
 Fluorescent tracer, a substance such as 2-NBDG containing a fluorophore that is used for tracking purposes
 Histochemical tracer, a substance used for tracing purposes in histochemistry, the study of the composition of cells and tissues
 Isotopic tracer, a substance with an isotope that has been enriched to a greater level than that found in nature
 Radioactive tracer, a substance containing a radioisotope that is used for tracking purposes
 TRACER (cosmic ray detector) (Transition Radiation Array for Cosmic Energetic Radiation), a balloon-borne cosmic ray detector
 Tracers, a colloquialism for visual trailing, often experienced in connection with drug use
 TRACERS (Tandem Reconnection and Cusp Electrodynamics Reconnaissance Satellites), a pair of orbiters to study the origins of the solar wind and how it affects Earth

Military
 Tracers, tracer ammunition, special bullets that burn brightly to enable the shooter to follow the bullets' trajectories
 Tactical reconnaissance and counter-concealment-enabled radar (TRACER), a radar system developed by the United States Army
 Grumman E-1 Tracer, a carrier-borne early warning aircraft used by the United States Navy in the 1960s
 Tactical Reconnaissance Armoured Combat Equipment Requirement, a joint British–American scout vehicle

Arts and entertainment

Music
 Tracer (band), an Australian rock band
 Tracer (album), a 2012 album by Teengirl Fantasy
 "Tracers", song by Ash (band) from A-Z, Vol.1 2010
 "Tracers", song by Miracle Fortress from Was I the Wave? 2011
 "Tracers", song by Trans-Siberian Orchestra from Night Castle 2009

Films
 Tracer (film), a 2016 Vietnamese film
 Tracers (film), a 2015 American film

Video games
 Tracer (game), a 1995 action-puzzle video game
 Tracer, a 1976 Sega arcade video game
 Tracer, leader of the Eliminators in The Warriors
 Tracer (Overwatch), a player character from the video games Overwatch and Heroes of the Storm
 Tracer Tong, a character from the video game series Deus Ex

Comics and comic strips
 Tracer (DC Comics), a DC Comics character
 Tracer (Marvel Comics), a Marvel Comics supervillain
 Tracer Bullet, one of Calvin's alter egos in Calvin and Hobbes

Television
 Tracer (TV series), a 2022 South Korean television series

Transportation
 Mercury Tracer, an automobile
 Tracer (bus), the bus system for Tracy, California

See also
 
 
 Trace (disambiguation)
 Tracing (disambiguation)
 Tracer Bullet (disambiguation)
 Traceur, a parkour practitioner